New York's 37th State Senate district is one of 63 districts in the New York State Senate. It has been represented by Democrat Shelley Mayer since 2018, following her victory in a competitive special election to succeed fellow Democrat George Latimer, who had recently been elected Westchester County Executive.

Geography
District 37 covers a swath of Westchester County in the suburbs of New York City, including some or all of Bedford, Eastchester, Harrison, Larchmont, Mamaroneck, New Rochelle, North Castle, Port Chester, Rye, Rye Brook, White Plains, and Yonkers.

The district overlaps New York's 16th, 17th, and 18th congressional districts, and with the 88th, 89th, 90th, 91st, and 93rd districts of the New York State Assembly.

Recent election results

2020

2018

2018 special

2016

2014

2012

Federal results in District 37

References

37